Maria Eleanor David (born 30 November 1955) is an English actress who has worked on projects in the UK, the US and New Zealand. She won positive reviews for her starring role in the biopic Sylvia, in which she played pioneering educationalist Sylvia Ashton-Warner.

Life and career
David was born in Lincolnshire. She has appeared in several films and television programmes. Her work includes BAFTA-nominated comedy Comfort and Joy directed by Bill Forsyth, mini-series Paradise Postponed, Mike Leigh's Topsy-Turvy and Alan Parker's film of Pink Floyd The Wall, in which she played the wife of the main character.

In 1984 David travelled to New Zealand to star as Sylvia Ashton-Warner in the biopic Sylvia. Reviewing her performance, Janet Maslin of The New York Times commented: "Miss David bears a striking resemblance to the real woman and gives an intelligent, compassionate performance, limited only by the uncomplicated reverence with which the film makers regard their heroine." Village Voice critic Andrew Sarris praised the four principal actors and named Sylvia one of the ten best films of 1985.

Filmography
 The Scarlet Pimpernel (1982) - Louise
 Oliver Twist (1982) - Rose Maylie
 Pink Floyd The Wall (1982) - Pink's wife
 Comfort and Joy (1984) - Maddy
 Sylvia (1985) - Sylvia Ashton-Warner
 84 Charing Cross Road (1987) - Cecily Farr
 The Wolves of Willoughby Chase (1989) - Lady Willoughby
 Slipstream (1989) - Ariel
 Ladder of Swords (1989)
 White Hunter Black Heart (1990) - Dorshka Zibelinsky
 The King's Whore (1990) - La Reine
 Topsy-Turvy (1999) - Fanny Ronalds
 House of Boys (2009) - Emma

Television credits
 The Professionals, (TV series) episode Fugitive, 1980.
 The Borgias (1981, TV Mini-Series) - Sancia
 Reilly: Ace of Spies (1984, TV Mini-Series) - Eugenie
 Shroud for a Nightingale (1984, TV Mini-Series) - Jo Fallon
 The Return of Sherlock Holmes (1986) - Mrs St Clair
 Paradise Postponed (1986, TV Mini-Series) - Agnes Simcox / Agnes Salter
 Lovejoy (1992) - Katriona Brooksby
 Rumpole of the Bailey (1992) - Elizabeth Casterini
 Ruth Rendell Mysteries (1993) - Alice Fielding in "Vanity Dies Hard"
 Between the Lines (1993) - Penny Shaw
 Drop the Dead Donkey (1993) - Lady Caroline
 The Inspector Alleyn Mysteries (1994) - Margaret Ballantyne in "Dead Water"
 Midsomer Murders (2001) - Georgina Canning in “Tainted Fruit”
 The Last Detective (2002) - Tricia Lloyd
 The Rotters Club  (2005) - Ursula Boyd
 Sherlock Holmes and the Case of the Silk Stocking  (2004) - Mary Pentney
 Playhouse Presents  (2013) - Kathleen

References

External links
 

1955 births
Living people
Actors from Lincolnshire
English film actresses
English stage actresses
English television actresses